Bear River 6B is a 24.3ha Mi'kmaq reserve located in Annapolis County, Nova Scotia. It has a population of 16 in 2016.

It is administratively part of the Bear River First Nation.

References

Indian reserves in Nova Scotia
Communities in Annapolis County, Nova Scotia
Mi'kmaq in Canada